The Very Best of Judy Garland is a three-disc box set of Judy Garland songs released in 2007. The set features previously unreleased and digitally remastered tracks.

Track listing
 This Is The Time Of The Evening/While We're Young
 Judy's Olio Medley: You Made Me Love You (I Didn't Want to Do It)/For Me And My Gal/The Boy Next Door/The Trolley Song
 A Pretty Girl Milking Her Cow
 Carolina In The Morning
 Rock-A-Bye Your Baby With A Dixie Melody
 Danny Boy
 Over The Rainbow
 Come Rain Or Come Shine
 Just Imagine
 I Feel A Song Comin' On
 Last Night When We Were Young
 Life Is Just A Bowl Of Cherries
 April Showers
 Maybe I'll Come Back
 Dirty Hands, Dirty Face
 Lucky Day
 Memories Of You
 Any Place I Hang My Hat Is Home
 By Myself
 Little Girl Blue
 Me & My Shadow
 Among My Souvenirs
 I Gotta Right To Sing The Blues
 I Get The Blues When It Rains
 Mean To Me
 Then You've Never Been Blue
 How About Me?
 Just A Memory
 Blue Prelude
 Happy New Year
 It's Lovely To Be Back In London
 Zing! Went The Strings Of My Heart (Mono)
 I Can't Give You Anything But Love
 This Is It
 More Than You Know
 I Am Loved (Mono)
 I Concentrate On You
 I'm Confessin' (That I Love You)
 Do I Love You?
 Do It Again
 Day In - Day Out
 After You've Gone
 That's All There Is, There Isn't Any More
 That's Entertainment!
 Who Cares (As Long As You Care For Me) (Live)
 I've Confessed To The Breeze (I Love You)
 If I Love Again
 Puttin' On The Ritz
 Old Devil Moon
 Down With Love
 Just You, Just Me
 Alone Together
 Stormy Weather
 You Go To My Head
 Judy At The Palace/Shine On Harvest Moon/ Some Of These Days/My Man/I Don't Care
 Over The Rainbow (Alternate Take)
 Man That Got Away (Live)
 If Love Were All (Live)
 Comes Once In A Lifetime
 Sweet Danger
 Just In Time (Live)
 It Never Was You
 I Could Go On Singing (Till The Cows Come Home)
 It's A Good Day
 That's All
 Some People
 When The Saints Go Marching In/Brotherhood Of Man
 He's Got The Whole World In His Hands (Live)
 Zing! Went the Strings of My Heart (Stereo)
 I Am Loved (Stereo)

External links
Album At Amazon
The Judy Garland Online Discography "The Very Best Of Judy Garland" page

Judy Garland albums
2007 greatest hits albums